Gymnopilus vialis is a species of mushroom in the family Hymenogastraceae.

See also

List of Gymnopilus species

External links
Gymnopilus vialis at Index Fungorum

vialis
Taxa named by William Alphonso Murrill